Post-literacy or post-literacy education is a concept used in continuing education and adult education programs aimed at recently literate or "neo-literate" adults and communities, largely in the developing world. Unlike continuing education or further education, which covers secondary or vocational topics for adult learners, post-literacy programs provide skills which might otherwise be provided in primary education settings. Post-literacy education aims to solidify literacy education, provide resources and media aimed at the newly literate, and also may create systems of non-formal education to serve these communities. Projects include providing formal continuing education, providing  written materials (the literate environment) relevant to economic development to newly literate members of developing societies, and leveraging radio and other non-written media to increase access to educational material in informal settings.

See also
Education in Mali
History of education in the United States
International Literacy Day
Literacy
Literacy in India
National literacy mission (India)
Nicaraguan Literacy Campaign
UNESCO Confucius Prize for Literacy
United Nations Literacy Decade

References

Bibliography
Dave, R. H.; And Others. Learning Strategies for Post-Literacy and Continuing Education: A Cross-National Perspective. Second Edition. Outcomes of an International Research Project. Studies on Post-Literacy and Continuing Education 1.  (1988)
Manandhar, Udaya; And Others. Empowering Women and Families through Literacy in Nepal. [and] Participatory Video as a Post-Literacy Activity for Women in Rural Nepal. Convergence v27 n2-3 p102-118 1994
 Muller, Josef, (Ed.). Learning Strategies for Post-Literacy. The Tanzanian Approach. A Reader. German Foundation for International Development, Tanzania Ministry of Education, (1986)
Kothari, B. Same language subtitling: Integrating post literacy development and popular culture on television. Media and Technology for Human Resource Development, 1999
Lasway, Rest B. The Impact of Post-Literacy: A Tanzanian Case Study. International Review of Education, Vol. 35, No. 4, Post-Literacy (1989), pp. 479–489 
Ouane, Adama . Rural Newspapers and Radio of Post-Literacy in Mali. Prospects: Quarterly Review of Education v12 n2 p243-53 1982
Ouane, Adama (ed), R. H. Dave (Author), D. A. Perera (Author). Learning Strategies for Post-Literacy and Continuing Education in Mali, Niger, Senegal and Upper Volta/U1475 (UIE studies on post-literacy and continuing education)Unesco Inst of Education (July 1986) 
Ranaweera, A. M.(Ed.), R. H. Dave (Author), A. Ouane (Author). Learning Strategies for Post-Literacy and Continuing Education in Brazil, Colombia, Jamaica and Venezuela (Uie Studies on Post-Literacy and Continuin). Unesco Inst of Education (August 1987)  
Rogers, Alan (ed), Bryan Maddox, Juliet Milligan, Katy Newell Jones, Uta Papen, Anna Robinson-Pant. Re-defining Post-Literacy in a Changing World. Department for International Development, Education Research Report No. 29, London. (1999)  
Srivastava, Hari S. Some Innovative Initiatives in Literacy, Post-Literacy and Continuing Education in Asia. International Review of Education, Vol. 30, No. 3, Adult Education in a Rapidly Changing World (1984), pp. 369–375 
Zhu, Qing-Ping and Rong-Guang Dai. Institutions of post-literacy in China. International Review of Education/Internationale Zeitschrift für Erziehungswissenschaft/Revue internationale l'éducation. Volume 35, Number 4 / December, 1989

Literacy
Reading (process)
Adult education